Boureima Maïga (born November 15, 1983 in Bobo Dioulasso) is a Burkinabé football player who currently plays for Lance FC de Réo.

Career 
Maïga began his career with Planète Champion. In July 2002 he signed a contract with  KSC Lokeren. He spent two years with Lokeren, and left in the summer of 2004 to go back to Planète Champion. After only one year with his youth club Planète Champion, he signed in summer 2006 with KRC Waregem. He played 20 games for K. Racing Waregem, then left the club to sign with K.V. Oostende on 6 August 2007. Maïga left after one year and nineteen games, who scores one goal Oostende and moved to KMSK Deinze.

International career 
He was a member of the Burkinabé 2003 FIFA World Youth Championship team in United Arab Emirates and 1999 FIFA U-17 World Championship in New Zealand. Maïga is member for the Les Etalons and holds three games there.

Personal life 
Maïga, who was born Bobo Dioulasso in Burkina Faso, holds a Belgian passport.

References

External links 
 

1983 births
Living people
Burkinabé footballers
Association football midfielders
Burkina Faso international footballers
Planète Champion players
K.S.C. Lokeren Oost-Vlaanderen players
K.V. Oostende players
K.M.S.K. Deinze players
Belgian Pro League players
Challenger Pro League players
Burkinabé expatriate footballers
Expatriate footballers in Belgium
People from Bobo-Dioulasso
21st-century Burkinabé people